Gary Wayne Goldman (born November 17, 1944) is an American film producer, director, animator, writer and voice actor. He is known for working on films with Don Bluth such as All Dogs Go to Heaven for his directorial debut, Anastasia, An American Tail, and The Land Before Time. He was an animator at Disney before working at Sullivan Bluth Studios with Bluth.

Early life 
Goldman was born in Oakland, California and raised in Watsonville, California. As a youth, Goldman was active in sports, an infielder in baseball and quarterback in high school football, he studied piano and enjoyed model-making and drawing. Before devoting himself entirely to the arts, he served as an electronics technician in the United States Air Force from 1962 to 1967, assigned duties in Japan and Germany. He received his Associate of Arts Degree in 1969 from Cabrillo College, and he graduated in December 1971 with a Bachelor of Fine Arts degree in Life Drawing and Art History from the University of Hawaii.

Career

Disney 
Goldman began his career in animation when he joined Walt Disney Productions in February 1972. His first assignment was as an in-betweener to legendary Disney animator Frank Thomas on the film Robin Hood. He then worked alongside Don Bluth, as an animator, on Winnie the Pooh and Tigger Too! and The Rescuers before serving as Directing Animator on Pete's Dragon and The Small One.

In an effort to accelerate their skills in preparation for leadership assignments within the Disney organization, Goldman and Bluth began to purchase used animation equipment and probe every aspect of animated production, at Don Bluth's home. United by the common goal of restoring the lost techniques of classical animation, Goldman and Bluth, along with animator John Pomeroy, produced, directed and animated the classically animated 27-minute, filmed-featurette Banjo the Woodpile Cat. Their enthusiasm attracted many other artists at Disney, who came by the garage to contribute their time and artistry to the project. It took four years, working nights and weekends in Bluth's garage. In December 1979, the film was shown at the Egyptian theater in Hollywood and the Peppertree theater in Northridge. It received the National Film Advisory Board Award for Excellence, and the Golden Scroll Award from the Academy of Science Fiction, Fantasy and Horror Films. Using what they learned on their project, they attempted to implement their techniques on projects at Disney. Banjo the Woodpile Cat was later shown on ABC Television (June 1982), as a prime time special.

Post-Disney 
Divided by disagreements over story and production values, Goldman, along with Bluth and Pomeroy, resigned from Walt Disney Productions to establish their independent animation studio, Don Bluth Productions, in 1979. The departure was highly publicized and the trio was dubbed "Disney Defectors" by news reporters.

Since leaving Disney, the team produced several feature films, starting with The Secret of NIMH, which won the Saturn Award for "Best Animated Feature" from the Science Fiction, Fantasy and Horror Film Academy. In late 1982, composer Jerry Goldsmith introduced them to director Steven Spielberg. Their first collaboration with Spielberg, which began production in January 1985, An American Tail, was released in November 1986 and ushered in a new era of success for the full-length animated feature, becoming the highest-grossing animated film up to that time.

Goldman was a producer on the highly successful animated laser disc interactive video games Dragon's Lair, Space Ace and Dragon's Lair II: Time Warp. Dragon's Lair received the Inkpot Award for the "First Interactive Laser Disc Arcade Game" and an Arkie Award for the "Best Arcade Audio/Visuals". Financial difficulties with their distributor cut them off from financing and forced them to seek protection from bankruptcy in 1984. It was at this time that they met mergers and acquisitions expert, Morris Sullivan, who set up a corporation, Sullivan Studios to allow the trio to continue while the bankruptcy courts slowly settled their company's case against its distributor.

In 1986, Sullivan moved Goldman, Bluth & Pomeroy, and the entire operation, including 87 employees and their families to Dublin, Ireland, at the invitation of IDA Ireland. Their third feature film, The Land Before Time, was their first production created primarily in Ireland. Sullivan transferred much of the ownership of the Dublin studio to the three animators and renamed the company Sullivan Bluth Studios. The company produced six feature films from 1986 until 1994. Sullivan retired in 1991 and the company was renamed Don Bluth Entertainment, Ireland, Ltd.

In August 1994, Goldman and Bluth returned from Ireland to head up the Fox Animation Studio located in Phoenix, Arizona where they shared creative leadership as producers and directors. The first production completed by the studio was the award-winning Anastasia in 1997. Also produced there was Bartok the Magnificent in 1999, and the animated science fiction post-apocalyptic film Titan A.E. in 2000. A fourth feature film, Africa, was in production when 20th Century Fox shut down its animation facility.

Goldman and Bluth have reestablished their independence with their production company Don Bluth Films, Inc., developing feature-length properties. The company established a website where they communicate with their audience on a personal level and provide animation information online.

In August 2007, Goldman was named an artist in residence at the Savannah College of Art and Design for the college's 10-week winter quarter starting in January 2008. Goldman lectured on animation, as well as taught undergraduate and graduate level classes in traditional 2-D animation production.

Miscellaneous 
Goldman has been a member of the Academy of Motion Picture Arts and Sciences since 1978.

Personal life 
While in college he married elementary teacher Janith Eileen Brand in April 1968. They separated in 1983 and divorced in 1987. They have two children, Kip and Andrew. In 2001 Goldman & Bluth received Lifetime Achievement Awards for their dedication and contribution to the art of animation from Animation Magazine, and in 2005, at the Savannah Film Festival, Lifetime Achievement Awards for animation, from the Savannah College of Art & Design, to which they gave their animation art archive. Goldman remarried in late 1988 to film cutter Cathy (Bassett) Carr. She and her three children John Carr, Jason Carr and Joanna Carr moved with him to Dublin, Ireland in 1986. Together they have nine grandchildren.

Filmography

Video games

Awards and nominations

References

External links 

 

Animators from California
Cabrillo College alumni
University of Hawaiʻi at Mānoa alumni
American film producers
American animated film directors
American animated film producers
Animation screenwriters
1944 births
Living people
Sullivan Bluth Studios people
United States Air Force airmen
People from Watsonville, California
Film directors from California
Walt Disney Animation Studios people